Roger Searle Payne (born January 29, 1935) is an American biologist and environmentalist famous for the 1967 discovery (with Scott McVay) of whale song among humpback whales. Payne later became an important figure in the worldwide campaign to end commercial whaling.

History
Payne was born in New York, New York, and received his BA degree at Harvard University and his Ph.D. at Cornell. He spent the early years of his career studying echolocation in bats (and how their food, moths, avoid them) and auditory localization in owls. Desiring to work with something more directly linked to conservation he later focused his research on whales where, together with researcher Scott McVay, in 1967 they discovered the complex sonic arrangements performed by the male humpback whales during the breeding season. These findings were published in the article Songs of humpback whales in 1971.

Payne describes the whale songs as "exuberant, uninterrupted rivers of sound" with long repeated "themes", each song lasting up to 30 minutes and sung by an entire group of male humpbacks at once. The songs would be varied slightly between each breeding season, with a few new phrases added on and a few others dropped.  Payne has led many expeditions on the world's oceans studying whales, their migrations, cultures and vocalizations.

Payne was also the first to suggest fin whales and blue whales can communicate with sound across whole oceans, a theory since confirmed.

Some of Payne's recordings were released in 1970 as an LP called Songs of the Humpback Whale (still the best-selling nature sound record of all time) which helped to gain momentum for the Save the Whales movement seeking to end commercial whaling, which at the time was pushing many species dangerously close to extinction. Commercial whaling was finally banned by the International Whaling Commission in 1986.

In 1975 a second LP was released, and in 1987 Payne collaborated with musician Paul Winter putting whalesong to human music.

Whale recordings by Frank Watlington (with commentary by Roger Payne) were released on a Flexi disc soundsheet inside the January 1979 National Geographic magazine. This issue, at 10.5 million copies, became the largest single press run of any record at the time.

In addition to whale recordings Payne has also published books and worked with film crews on many television documentary productions and on the IMAX movie Whales: An Unforgettable Journey.

In 1971, Payne founded Ocean Alliance, a 501(c)3 organization working with whale and ocean conservation. It is based in Gloucester, Massachusetts.  He still heads the organization.  He was also an assistant professor of biology at Rockefeller University and, concurrently, a research zoologist at the Institute for Research in Animal Behavior (IRAB), run by Rockefeller University and the Wildlife Conservation Society, then known as the New York Zoological Society. IRAB was succeeded by the Wildlife Conservation Society's Center for Field Biology and Conservation (CFBC) in 1972, and Payne continued as a Wildlife Conservation Society research zoologist and Scientific Director of the Society's Whale Fund until 1983.

From 1960 to 1985 Roger Payne was married to noted elephant researcher Katharine Payne, who performed similar research on the vocalizations of elephants and humpbacks.

Cultural influence
Singer Judy Collins released her best-selling album Whales & Nightingales in 1970, which featured some of Roger's whale recordings on the track "Farewell to Tarwathie."
Also in 1970 composer Alan Hovhaness composed And God Created Great Whales, the score for which calls for excerpts from Payne's recordings
In 1977 Roger Payne's recordings of Humpback whales were included in the Voyager Golden Record carried aboard the Voyager program spacecraft, the first human artifacts to leave our Solar System.
Singer Kate Bush's debut album The Kick Inside in 1978 features a portion of 'slowed-down solo whale' (from Songs of the Humpback Whale) as an intro to the opening track "Moving".
Star Trek IV: The Voyage Home (1986) features Payne's recordings, in a plot about rescuing Humpback whales from extinction by moving a breeding pair from 1986 to three hundred years in the future.
In 2010, the band Glass Wave included Payne's whale recordings in the first track ("Balena") and last track ("Moby Dick") of their album.

Works 
Producer, Songs of the Humpback Whale, a 1970 LP (and later CD)
Producer, Deep Voices, a 1975 LP of more Humpback songs as well as blue and Fin whales
Co-Producer, Whales Alive, a 1987 LP collaboration with musicians Paul Winter and Paul Halley
Host, In the Company of Whales, a 1991 TV documentary for The Discovery Channel
Author, Among Whales, a 1995 book
Host, Finite Oceans, a 1995 TV documentary
Co-Writer/co-director, Whales: An Unforgettable Journey, a 1997 IMAX film

References

External links
 Roger Payne Bio on Ocean Alliance Website
 salon.com interview

21st-century American biologists
American marine biologists
American environmentalists
Cetologists
Capitol Records artists
Zoomusicology
Harvard University alumni
Cornell University alumni
1935 births
Living people
MacArthur Fellows